Crematogaster ambigua is a species of ant in tribe Crematogastrini. It was described by Santschi in 1926.

References

ambigua
Insects described in 1926
Taxa named by Felix Santschi